Events from the year 1920 in Sweden

Incumbents
 Monarch – Gustaf V
 Prime Minister – Nils Edén, Hjalmar Branting, Gerhard Louis De Geer

Events

 4–17 September – the 1920 Swedish general election
 The local social democratic women's clubs of Sweden is organised in the Social Democratic Women in Sweden.
 Legal majority for married women and equal marriage rights.

Sports 
August/September – at the 1920 Summer Olympics in Antwerp, Sweden won 64 Olympic medals, including nineteen gold medals.

Births

 17 April – Bengt Anderberg, writer. 
 31 October – Gunnar Gren, footballer (died 1991).

Deaths
 7 April – Hildegard Björck, scholar, first woman in Sweden to gain a degree  (born 1847)
 10 April - Amanda Kerfstedt, writer (born 1835)
 21 June - Nanna Hoffman factory owner (born 1846)
 20 November –  Ida Göthilda Nilsson, sculptor   (born 1840)
 27 October - Agda Montelius, philanthropist and women's rights activist  (born 1850)
 Anna Rönström, educator and mathematician  (born 1847)
 Amanda Rylander, actress (born 1834)

References

External links

 
Sweden
Years of the 20th century in Sweden